Rugby Challenge 3 is a rugby union simulation video game, developed by Wicked Witch Software and published by Tru Blu Entertainment. This is the third game in the Rugby Challenge series. It is the sequel to Rugby Challenge and Rugby Challenge 2, both of which were developed by Sidhe. Rugby Challenge 3 was released on PlayStation 4, Xbox One, PlayStation 3, Xbox 360 on April 14, 2016 in New Zealand, and in Australia on April 22, 2016. It was released for Microsoft Windows on June 24, 2016.

Rugby Challenge 3 is the first game in the series to include the seven-a-side variant of rugby union. It is also the first in the series to include a licence for SANZAR teams. However, it does not feature the Top 14 or The Pro12.

Features
The features and content of Rugby Challenge 3 include:
Updated graphics for the next-gen consoles.
English language commentary from Grant Nisbett and Justin Marshall and French language commentary from Eric Bayle and Thomas Lombard.
Full SANZAR licence, marking the first time in Rugby Challenge that the full official Super Rugby will be playable instead of the generic Super 15.

New features and game modes
Rugby sevens
Be a Pro Mode - join a club as a rookie player and work your way up over 13 seasons
FanHub - Create, edit and share players
Full official licences with New Zealand, Australia, South Africa and England national teams.
Fully Licensed Super Rugby, as well as feeder competitions, including South Africa's Currie Cup, Australia's National Rugby Championship, and New Zealand's Mitre 10 Cup.
Aviva Premiership will be licensed due to licensing with the Rugby Football Union

Stadiums: Rugby Challenge 3 will feature over 40 stadiums, including all 14 from New Zealand's Mitre 10 (formerly ITM) Cup.

Info
The game was released in New Zealand on April 14, 2016, and in Australia on April 22, 2016. Rugby Challenge 3 was available on PlayStation 3, PlayStation 4, Xbox 360, Xbox One, and Microsoft Windows.

Game modes
Single Match
Competition Mode
Career Mode
FanHub
Be a Pro Mode
Online Multi-Player Mode

Exceptions from previous games
Unlike the 1st and 2nd Rugby Challenge game, this version won't include the Top 14 and Pro12 tournaments due to the rights being licensed by Bigben Interactive.

Extensive customisation
As a tradition in Rugby Challenge titles, players will have the ability to extensively customise the players and teams and will be able to do so even more extensively this time with the new FanHub, where players can be uploaded to share with the community. A demo version of the FanHub for Windows was released on 28 July 2015 when the game was officially announced.

References

External links
Hes.net
Store.steampowered.com

2016 video games
Windows games
Sports video games with career mode
PlayStation 3 games
PlayStation 4 games
Xbox 360 games
Xbox One games
Rugby union video games
Video games developed in Australia
Video games set in Argentina
Video games set in Australia
Video games set in France
Video games set in Ireland
Video games set in New Zealand
Video games set in South Africa
Video games set in the United Kingdom
Wicked Witch Software games
Multiplayer and single-player video games
Tru Blu Entertainment games